Edgar David Morris (born May 12, 1914, in Harare (then Salisbury), died May 21, 2002, Johannesburg) was a Rhodesian cricket player.

He appeared in the Rhodesian representation in two first-class matches in 1945.

References 

Rhodesia cricketers
1914 births
2002 deaths